Friedrich August Raschig (also called Fritz Raschig) (8 June 1863 – 4 February 1928) was a German chemist and politician. He was born in Brandenburg an der Havel. After he received his PhD in 1884 from the University of Berlin for his work with Robert Wilhelm Bunsen, he started working at the BASF company. In 1891 he opened his own chemical company in Ludwigshafen am Rhein (which still operates today as Raschig GmbH).  He patented a number of chemical processes, particularly relating to phenols, one of which is now known as the Raschig phenol process, and nitrogen compounds—the Raschig process for producing hydroxylamine and the Olin Raschig process for producing hydrazine. He also developed improvements to distillation, in particular the Raschig ring, small metal or ceramic rings which are used in commercial fractional distillation columns.

References

Further reading 

1863 births
1928 deaths
People from Brandenburg an der Havel
People from the Province of Brandenburg
German Protestants
German Democratic Party politicians
Members of the Weimar National Assembly
Members of the Reichstag of the Weimar Republic
19th-century German chemists
20th-century German chemists